AFG may refer to:
 Afghanistan, ISO 3166-1 code
 AFG Arena,  St. Gallen, Switzerland
 Afghan Sign Language, ISO 639-3 code
 American Financial Group, insurer, Cincinnati, Ohio, US
 Former Automotive Financial Group, car dealers, Worthing, West Sussex, England